St Helena School may refer to:

 St Helena School, Colchester
 Chesterfield St Helena School

See also
Saint Helena (disambiguation)